National Fossil Wood Park, Sathanur is a National Geo-heritage Monument of India
 located at Sathanur in Perambalur district, Tamil Nadu. This park is located within Sathanur panchayat and has a fossilized tree trunk, which was discovered in 1940 by the geologist M. S. Krishnan of the Geological Survey of India, who  hailed from Tanjore.

The fossil 

The petrified tree trunk is believed to be over 120 million years old, and is considered to be evidence for the presence of a sea during the Cretaceous period in this area. This fossil is of a conifer, measures around 18 meters long and a geological treasure. Similar fossilized tree trunks have been found in nearby Varagur, Anaipadi, Alundalippur, and Saradamangalam, all located within  of Sathanur.

Visiting 
This national park is open to public throughout the year. Early visitors (1960s to 1980s) caused some damage by collecting samples for their research or in their college or university labs. Now it is well fenced and guarded.

This park is located approximately one kilometer north of Sathanur village. There used to be a sandy, muddy road and reaching the park used to be a very daunting task.

The nearest airport is at Trichy, while the nearest railway station is at Ariyalur. Buses also run regularly from the new Perambalur bus-stand to the Sathanur bus stop. Visitors can then walk or take bicycle to reach the park.

Footnotes 

1. Sathanur owes it to ‘kal maram' article by The Hindu - 16 August 2010 

2. Tamil article by Neethi Sengottaiyan - Navigate to the bottom

References 

National Geological Monuments in India
Perambalur district
Fossil parks in India
Jurassic paleontological sites